Lilleküla railway station is a railway station in the Kristiine district of Tallinn, the capital of Estonia. The station is situated between the subdistricts Lilleküla and Uus Maailm, and close to the Estonian national football home ground A. Le Coq Arena and Kristiine Keskus, one of the biggest and most popular shopping centres in Tallinn.

The station is served by all commuter trains heading to Keila, Paldiski, Turba and Kloogaranna. It consists of two 130 metre platforms. It is located about 2 km south of Balti jaam, it is the second stop on Elron's western route after the terminus Tallinn's main railway station Balti jaam.

Although the Tallinn–Paldiski railway already existed in 1870, a station on the site was opened in 1928. The line from Tallinn to back then a nearby town Nõmme (as far as Pääsküla) was electrified already in 1924. At first the station bore the name "Ameerika". There was also a little wooden station building which was demolished in 1998.

In 2012 the old platforms were replaced with new lower ones and a pedestrian tunnel was built.

See also
 List of railway stations in Estonia
 Rail transport in Estonia

References

External links

 Official website of Eesti Raudtee (EVR) – the national railway infrastructure company of Estonia  responsible for maintenance and traffic control of most of the Estonian railway network
 Official website of Elron – the national passenger train operating company of Estonia responsible for all domestic passenger train services in Estonia

Railway stations in Estonia
Transport in Tallinn
Railway stations opened in 1928
1928 establishments in Estonia
Buildings and structures in Tallinn